Jaroslav Bulant (born 21 April 1964) is a Czech former professional tennis player.

Biography
Bulant was born in Třebíč and based in Jihlava when he turned professional in 1986.

In 1988 he won a Challenger title in Zurich and made his first Grand Prix appearance, at the Prague Open. He reached his career best ranking of 142 in 1989, a year he appeared at five Grand Prix tournaments and won a further Challenger title in Nicosia. In 1994, by then competing on the ATP Tour, Bulant upset the world's 20th ranked player at the Colombia Open, Carlos Costa, who was also the top seed.

Since retiring he has worked as a coach. In 2005 he coached Lucie Šafářová and in 2008 was coach of Dominik Hrbatý. From late 2009 to early 2010 he coached Dominika Cibulková.

Challenger titles

Singles: (2)

Doubles: (2)

References

External links
 
 

1964 births
Living people
Czechoslovak male tennis players
Czech male tennis players
Czech tennis coaches
Sportspeople from Třebíč